Ananda Vikatan  is a Tamil-language weekly magazine published from Chennai, India.

History and profile
Ananda Vikatan was started by Late Pudhoor Vaidyanadhaiyar in February 1926 as a monthly publication. The issue for December 1927 was not published due to financial difficulties. In January 1928 Subramaniam Srinivasan bought the rights from Vaidyanadhaiyer and relaunched the publication from February 1928 in a new format He paid  at the rate of ₹25 per alphabet in the Tamil language name (ஆனந்த விகடன்) of the publication to buy the rights. He built it up into a weekly and sales soon rose. Veteran journalist and media personality and son of Subramaniam Srinivasan, S. Balasubramanian served as editor, managing director and publisher of the magazine for nearly 50 years till 2006. He also started the "Manavar Thittam" or student journalism scheme that is active for the last 30 years and counting. He also launched Junior Vikatan, a biweekly Tamil investigative journal in the 1980s. He continues to be Chairman Emeritus of the group after handing over the reins to his son B. Srinivasan.

Visual media 
Vikatan Televistas was launched by Vasan Publications in the late 1990s starting with Mega-serials on Sun TV. In 2020, during the COVID-19 pandemic it withdrew from Sun TV and decided to move.
Since 2021, it has been producing and making stories for Star Vijay

Tamil television
The company ventured into film production as Vikatan Talkies, and successfully made the comedy Siva Manasula Sakthi starring Jiiva and Anuya that launched the career of the director Rajesh. They then followed this with the commercially unsuccessful Vaalmiki.  The media house still produces a variety of programs for television and has branched out into various streams of media content with an online digital broadcast of snippets of news, views, interviews etc.
Films
Siva Manasula Sakthi (2009)
Valmiki (2009)

Serials

Web Series

Ananda Vikatan Cinema Awards 

The awards ceremony has been held since 2008, with the most recent being in January 2019.

Circulation details
According to the Audit Bureau of Circulation, for the period of July–December 2004, circulation stood at 4,30,534 per week. This represents a 22 per cent growth over the previous half-year period..

References

External links
Official Website
J-POD: B. Srinivasan of Ananda Vikatan, podcast on Krishna Prasad's jpod

Companies based in Chennai
Magazines established in 1926
Mass media in Chennai
Tamil-language magazines
Weekly magazines published in India
1926 establishments in India